Hans-Edgar Endres (born 17 August 1894, date of death unknown) was a German bobsledder. He competed in the four-man event at the 1928 Winter Olympics.

References

1894 births
Year of death missing
German male bobsledders
Olympic bobsledders of Germany
Bobsledders at the 1928 Winter Olympics
Sportspeople from Metz